Bymainiella is a genus of Australian funnel-web spiders that was first described by R. J. Raven in 1978. This genus is named in honour of the Australian arachnologist Barbara York Main.

Species
 it contains four species:
Bymainiella lugubris Raven, 1978 – Australia (New South Wales)
Bymainiella monteithi Raven, 1978 – Australia (Queensland, New South Wales)
Bymainiella polesoni Raven, 1978 – Australia (New South Wales)
Bymainiella terraereginae (Raven, 1976) (type) – Australia (Queensland, New South Wales)

References

Hexathelidae
Mygalomorphae genera
Spiders of Australia